David Milton "Pete" Balliet (August 25, 1866 – August 6, 1960) was an American football player and coach.  He served as the head football coach at Auburn University for one game in February 1893, at Purdue University from 1893 to 1895 and again in 1901, and at Washington and Lee University from 1903 to 1904, compiling a career college football record of 30–15–2.  Balliet played as a center at Lehigh University and Princeton University.

Early years and playing career

Balliet was a native of Lehighton, Pennsylvania and was born on August 25, 1866.  He attended preparatory school at the Meyerstown Academy and then played center for two seasons for the Lehigh University football team.

Princeton
In the fall of 1892, Balliet joined the Princeton Tigers football team.  In September 1892, The New York Times reported: "Among the promising new men who are practicing are Balliet, centre rush of last year's Lehigh team."  He played at center for Princeton during the 1892 and 1893 seasons. 

The 1893 Princeton team finished the season undefeated at 11–0, and was later recognized as a national champion. Balliet graduated from Princeton with the class of 1894.

Coaching career
Balliet was the second head coach in the history of Auburn Tigers football.  He coached only a single game for the program, a contest against Alabama played on February 22, 1893 at Lakeview Park in Birmingham, Alabama, the first intercollegiate game in the state.  Auburn defeated Alabama in the game, the first meeting between the two schools, by a score of 32 to 22.

In the fall of 1893, Balliet became the head football coach at Purdue University.  He led the team to a 5–2–1 record in 1893 and 9–1 in 1894.  During the 1894 season, Balliet's Purdue squad defeated Amos Alonzo Stagg's Chicago Maroons and outscored opponents by a collective score of 177 to 42.  His 1895 squad finished with a record of 4–3.  In 1897, Balliet was reported to have given up a successful law practice to join the Klondike Gold Rush in Alaska.

Balliet was re-hired as the head coach at Purdue in September 1901.  He led the 1901 Purdue team to a 4–4–1 record, but finished the season with consecutive losses to Notre Dame, Illinois, and Northwestern.  At the end of the 1901 season, Purdue opted not to renew his services.  In March 1902, the Indianapolis News reported, "He is known to be a good coach, but he turned out a loser last year and Purdue wants a change."  In four seasons as Purdue's head coach, Balliet compiled a record of 22–10–2.

Balliet began the fall of 1902 back at his alma mater, Princeton, as an assistant coach.  In early October, he joined the football team at Washington and Lee University to assist physical director, Bill Wertenbaker.  Balliet served as the head football coach at Washington and Lee for the 1903 and 1904 seasons.

Family and later years
Balliet married Sara A. Uhrich on July 19, 1894.  The couple had a daughter, Catharine Urich, born on July 5, 1895.  He moved to Myerstown, Pennsylvania in approximately 1895 and lived there for the next 65 years.  Balliet worked for most of his career as a coal salesman.  In 1909, Balliet was employed by the Clark Brothers Coal Mining Company in Philadelphia. He described himself at the time as "a globe-trotter for a wholesale coal company."

Death
He died at his home in Myerstown on August 6, 1960 at age 93.

Head coaching record

See also
 List of college football head coaches with non-consecutive tenure

Notes

References

External links
 

1866 births
1960 deaths
19th-century players of American football
American football centers
Auburn Tigers football coaches
Lehigh Mountain Hawks football players
Purdue Boilermakers football coaches
Princeton Tigers football coaches
Princeton Tigers football players
Washington and Lee Generals football coaches
People from Lehighton, Pennsylvania
People from Lebanon County, Pennsylvania
Players of American football from Pennsylvania
American businesspeople in the coal industry